David Roger Higgins (September 11, 1938 – August 13, 2006) was a composer and choral conductor. Born in Sheffield, England, he began teaching music at the age of 22. During his time in Sheffield he was the organist of the Sheffield University Church and musical director of Opera 14. In 1974, he was appointed organist and choirmaster of St Oswald's Church, Durham, a position he held until his death in 2006. In 1983 a fire was started in the Organ Loft at the church resulting in the total destruction of the Harrison & Harrison Organ then in the building. This resulted in the design and installation of a new 3 manual Peter Collins organ at the rear of the church (speaking directly down the nave), built to Higgins' specification.

Higgins' numerous compositions mainly concentrate on Anglican Sacred Music, although there is also repertoire for organ. His collected works were published in three volumes in 1999 by St Oswald's, with one piece - "Author of Life Divine" having also been published by the RSCM as the title piece to a small anthology.

1938 births
2006 deaths
Musicians from Sheffield
20th-century British conductors (music)